NSB El 14 is a Norwegian electric locomotive operated by CargoNet for freight trains hauling. Built between 1968 and 1973 by Thune as a general purpose engine for the Norwegian State Railways (NSB), they were seen hauling passenger trains until the 1980s. Of the 31 units numbered 14 2164 to 14 2190 and 14 2197 to 14 2200, 11 remain in service.

History

The electrification of the Dovre Line in the late 1960s forced NSB to buy a more powerful universal locomotive than the El 13.

The only scrapping occurred in  December 2005 when one hit a large pile of rocks from a landslide near Evanger, Hordaland.

References

El 14
El 14
El 14
Co′Co′ locomotives
15 kV AC locomotives
Thune locomotives
Brown, Boveri & Cie locomotives
Electric locomotives of Norway
Railway locomotives introduced in 1968
Standard gauge locomotives of Norway
Co′Co′ electric locomotives of Europe